James Wormley Jones (September 22, 1884  – December 11, 1958) was an African-American policeman and World War I veteran, who is best known for having been the first African-American FBI special agent.

Early life 
Jones was born in Fort Monroe, Virginia. At a young age he moved with his family to Cambridge, Massachusetts, where he completed his early education. Returning to Virginia, he took up studies at Norfolk Mission College and a year later went to continue his education at Virginia Union University, though he did not graduate.

Police career 
Jones began service with the Washington Metropolitan Police Department in January 1905. He rose from being a footman to a horseman then a motorcycle policeman. His work resulted in being promoted to detective. During this time he and his wife Ethel T. (Peters) Jones became the parents of three children. Their son John B. Jones was born in 1910. Another son, Amos W. Jones, was born in 1911. Their daughter Mildred Theodora Jones was born in 1915.

Military exploits 
In 1917 Jones joined the United States Army. He attended the Officers' Training School in Des Moines, Iowa, and once his training was complete he was given a commission as a Captain. He was assigned to the 368th Infantry Regiment (United States), 92nd Division, in command of Company F.

After his company was sent to France in 1918, he saw action in the Vosges Mountains, Argonne Sector, and the Metz front.

During that time he became an instructor with the 92nd Division School of Specialists. His work there resulted in his being promoted to senior instructor. With the war's end in 1918 he resigned his post and resumed his work at the Metropolitan Police.

FBI and Marcus Garvey 

Jones was appointed as the first African-American special agent on November 19, 1919, by Bureau of Investigation director A. Bruce Bielaski. Jones was assigned to a new section of the Justice Department created to track the activities of groups perceived as subversive. His work there was under the direct supervision of J. Edgar Hoover.

During his time in the FBI, Jones served in New York City and Pittsburgh. In New York he was assigned to infiltrate the Universal Negro Improvement Association under the leadership of Marcus Garvey. Although he was seeking evidence of subversive activities during the "Red Scare" of 1919, Jones' work led to the arrest and trial of Garvey on mail fraud charges.

While conducting his surveillance, Jones adopted the code number 800 for his reports, and was also known as agent "800". He apparently knew that his clandestine role was not well concealed. During a March 1920 speech at the UNIA Liberty Hall he took special pains to point out to the audience that he was indeed of African ancestry, although he had the appearance of a person of Caucasian or European ancestry. Nevertheless, he engendered the trust of the UNIA leadership to such an extent that he was able to gain responsibility for registering all incoming correspondence. His access to UNIA correspondence along with his position as Adjutant General in the African Legion were essential in enabling his information gathering activities.

In August 1921 Jones began conducting similar surveillance on the African Blood Brotherhood. Eventually recognized as an ex-police officer, Jones was no longer an asset as a clandestine agent and he resigned from the Bureau on April 14, 1923.

Jones died on December 11, 1958, in Dormont, Pennsylvania.

On the February 10th 2021 episode of The Daily Show with Trevor Noah, Roy Wood Jr. performed a comedy segment on James Wormley Jones accusing him of being a "black spy" who put Marcus Garvey in prison.

Further reading
Athan G. Theoharis, The FBI: A Comprehensive Reference Guide, 1998 (409 pages), p. 335.
Robert A. Hill, Marcus Garvey, Universal Negro Improvement Association, The Marcus Garvey and Universal Negro Improvement Association Papers: 1826–August 1919.
Mitchel P. Roth, Historical Dictionary of Law Enforcement.
Emmett J. Scott, AM., LL.D. Scott's Official History of the American Negro in the World War.

References

External links
People and Events - J. Edgar Hoover
Negro Heroes of the War, Chapter XVIII: Captain Jones and His Gallant Fighters
Federal Surveillance of African-Americans (1917–1925): The First World War, the Red Scare, and the Garvey Movement

1884 births
1958 deaths
African-American police officers
Federal Bureau of Investigation agents
Metropolitan Police Department of the District of Columbia officers
People from Hampton, Virginia
20th-century African-American people